The Boralday (Boraldai) is a river of southern Kazakhstan. It is a right tributary of the Arys, of the Syr Darya basin.

See also
List of rivers of Kazakhstan

References

Rivers of Kazakhstan